Teymoor Nabili  is a veteran journalist and broadcaster, and CEO of a startup online news venture called "The Signal".

The Signal aims to be a news and research platform covering issues relating to the ASEAN region.

Nabili is also the host and Executive Editor of two programmes on Channel News Asia : "Between The Lines" is a nightly current affairs discussion focusing on issues relevant to Asia; "Perspectives" is a regular series of panel debates recorded before a live audience in Singapore.

During a career spanning 30 years, Nabili has covered news in more than 30 countries across Europe, Asia and the Americas for Al Jazeera English, the BBC, CNN, and CNBC and Channel 4 News.

The major stories he has covered include the 9/11 attack from New York City; the Asian tsunami disaster from Sri Lanka; the Iran Presidential election of 2009 from Tehran; the 2008 Olympics from Beijing and the earthquake/tsunami of 2011 from Japan. He has interviewed numerous world leaders, politicians and newsmakers, among them the Prime Ministers of Malaysia, Spain, Thailand and Singapore; the current Secretary General of the United Nations Ban Ki Moon and his predecessor Kofi Annan, and David Beckham.

He was voted 'Best Presenter/Anchor' at the 2005 Asia Television Awards and shared a UK Royal Television Society Award for coverage of the Olympic bribery scandal in Utah. He is also a business studies graduate from the University of Portsmouth.

In the spring of 2022, Nabili left CNA (Channel NewsAsia) and rejoined CNBC Asia.

References

Al Jazeera people
Living people
Year of birth missing (living people)
Alumni of the University of Portsmouth